The 1987 Critérium du Dauphiné Libéré was the 39th edition of the cycle race and was held from 25 May to 2 June 1987. The race started in Grenoble and finished in Carpentras. The race was won by Charly Mottet of the Système U team.

Teams
Fifteen teams, containing a total of 131 riders, participated in the race:

 
 
 
 
 
 
 
 
 
 
 
 Colombia amateur team
 Poland amateur team
 Czechoslovakia amateur team
 Italy amateur team

Route

General classification

References

Further reading

1987
1987 in French sport
1987 Super Prestige Pernod International
May 1987 sports events in Europe
June 1987 sports events in Europe